Grand Ayatollah Sayed Mohammed Ali Tabatabai Al-Hassani (1945 – February 2017) was an Iraqi, Twelver Shia Muslim Marja'.

He studied in Shia Islamic seminaries of Karbala and Najaf, under Sayed Abul-Qasim Al-Khoei, Sayed Mohammed Al-Shirazi, amongst others.

The Sayed also resided in countries such as Pakistan, Kuwait and Syria where he taught many students in the religious seminaries.

Grand Ayatollah Sayed M. Ali Tabatabai lived in London, United Kingdom, and delivered speeches in his home. The Sayed also visited Shia Islamic centres and Hussainiyyas around Europe and London, including Masjid Al-Muhassin - the mosque of Sheikh Yasser Al-Habib, where the congregation, including Sheikh Yasser Al-Habib, would pray behind him. Sayed M. Ali Tabatabai is amongst the Shia Maraje who have given the Ijaza (scholarly licence) to Sheikh Yasser Al-Habib, attesting to Sheikh Yasser Al-Habib being a Mujtahid (i.e. at the level of Ijtihad).

Grand Ayatollah Sayed M. Ali Tabatabai has authored a number of books, and is known, amongst other things, for his stance against the Iranian regime, deeming them to be an un-Islamic government, and against the teachings of Shia Islam.

Death
Mohammad Ali Tabatabaei Hassani died on February 1, 2017, and is buried in Najaf.

See also
List of Maraji

References

External links
A speech by Sayyid Mohammad Ali Tabatabaei
Another speech by Sayyid Mohammad Ali Tabatabaei

Iraqi grand ayatollahs
Iraqi Islamists
Shia Islamists
Critics of Sunni Islam
1945 births
2017 deaths